The Archivist of the United States is the head and chief administrator of the National Archives and Records Administration (NARA) of the United States. The Archivist is responsible for the supervision and direction of the National Archives.

The first Archivist, R. D. W. Connor, began serving in 1934, when the National Archives was established as an independent federal agency by Congress. The Archivists served as subordinate officials of the General Services Administration from 1949 until the National Archives and Records Administration became an independent agency again on April 1, 1985. The position was most recently held by David Ferriero, who left office on April 30, 2022. President Joe Biden has named Colleen Joy Shogan as Archivist. Her nomination is currently pending before the Senate.

Background 
The Archivist is appointed by the President with the advice and consent of the Senate and is responsible for safeguarding and making available for study all the permanently valuable records of the federal government, including the original Declaration of Independence, Constitution and Bill of Rights, which are displayed in the Archives' main building in Washington, D.C.

Under Public Law No. 98-497, the Archivist also must maintain custody of state ratifications of amendments to the Constitution and it is the Archivist's duty to issue a certificate proclaiming a particular amendment duly ratified and part of the Constitution if the legislatures of at least three-quarters of the states approve the proposed amendment. The Amendment and its certificate of ratification are then published in the Federal Register and the amendment is included in the United States Statutes at Large. Before the enactment of that statute in 1984, that duty was vested in the General Services Administration, and, before the establishment of that Agency in 1949, it formed part of the duties of the United States Secretary of State.

In accordance with Title 1, Chapter 2 §106a of the United States Code, the Archivist of the United States also receives the original version of all statutes of the United States, once enacted. Joint Resolutions and Acts of Congress signed into law by the president are delivered by the office of the president to the National Archives. The same happens if a bill becomes law because the president fails to approve or veto it within the constitutionally mandated period of time (ten days, excluding Sundays, and only counted when Congress is in session). If the president vetoes a bill but the presidential veto is overridden, the new law is transmitted to the National Archives not by the office of the president, but by Congress: in this case, the presiding officer of the last House to consider the bill certifies that the presidential objection was overridden, and sends the new law to the Archivist of the United States. In all cases, the office of the Archivist (the National Archives) maintains custody of the original document and (by means of the Office of the Federal Register, a division of the National Archives), assigns the new Act of Congress a public law number, provides for its publication as a slip law and for the inclusion of the new statute in the United States Statutes at Large. The actual printing and circulation of the slip law and of the volumes of the United States Statutes at Large is the responsibility of the Government Publishing Office, headed by the Director of the Government Publishing Office.

By means of the Office of the Federal Register, the National Archives also publishes documents of the Executive Branch, such as presidential proclamations and executive orders, retaining custody of the original signed documents. NARA also has many duties regarding the preservation of presidential papers and materials.

In all United States presidential elections, the Archivist of the United States also has duties concerning the custody of Electoral College documents, such as certificates of ascertainment declaring the names of the presidential electors chosen in each state, and of the certificates of vote produced by the electors of each state. In practice, these administrative responsibilities are delegated to the Director of the Federal Register.

Archivists of the United States

Notes

References

External links
 Official website
 AOTUS Blog - from the "Collector in Chief"
 Archivists of the United States, 1934 – present

Heads of United States federal agencies
American archivists
National Archives and Records Administration
Constitutional history of the United States